Kelly Township is in Warren County, Illinois, United States. As of the 2010 census, its population was 346 and it contained 159 housing units.

A small portion of the village of Alexis is in this township.

Geography

Demographics

References

External links
City-data.com
Illinois State Archives

Townships in Warren County, Illinois
Galesburg, Illinois micropolitan area
Townships in Illinois